This is a list of all the United States Supreme Court cases from volume 488 of the United States Reports:

External links

1988 in United States case law
1989 in United States case law